Carrie Emerson Coyner is an American politician. She is a member of the Virginia House of Delegates, representing district 62.

Coyner has served as a member of the Chesterfield County School Board since 2011.

A Republican, Coyner ran in 2019 to succeed retiring delegate Riley Ingram for the 62nd district. She faced Democrat Lindsey Dougherty in the 2019 election, and won with 55.1% of the vote.

In 2021, Coyner was one of three Republicans who voted to abolish Virginia's death penalty.

References

Living people
21st-century American politicians
Women state legislators in Virginia
Year of birth missing (living people)
21st-century American women politicians
Politicians from Richmond, Virginia
People from Chesterfield, Virginia
Republican Party members of the Virginia House of Delegates